Patrick J. Crisham (born June 4, 1877 in Amesbury, Massachusetts – June 12, 1915 in Syracuse, New York) was an American baseball player who played infielder in Major League Baseball in 1899. He played for the Baltimore Orioles.

References

External links

1877 births
1938 deaths
19th-century baseball players
Major League Baseball infielders
Baltimore Orioles (NL) players
Providence Grays (minor league) players
Worcester Quakers players
Worcester Hustlers players
Syracuse Stars (minor league baseball) players
Lawrence Colts players
Lawrence Barristers players
Baseball players from Massachusetts
Lewiston (minor league baseball) players
Newport Colts players